George Henry Reed (8 August 1906 – 11 December 1988) was a Welsh cricketer.  Reed was a right-handed batsman who bowls left-arm fast-medium.  He was born at St Fagans, Glamorgan.

Reed made his first-class debut for Glamorgan against Lancashire in the 1934 County Championship.  He made 24 further first-class appearances for the county, the last of which came against Sussex in the 1938 County Championship.  Seen by some at Glamorgan as a potential long-term replacement for fast bowler Jack Mercer, Reed took 62 wickets at an average of 31.30, with best figures of 5/30.  His only five wicket haul came against Sussex in the 1936 County Championship.

He was released by Glamorgan at the end of the 1938 season, and subsequently becoming a police officer.  He died at Cardiff, Glamorgan on 11 December 1988.

References

External links
George Reed at ESPNcricinfo
George Reed at CricketArchive

1906 births
1988 deaths
Cricketers from Cardiff
Welsh cricketers
Glamorgan cricketers
Welsh police officers
[[category:Glamorgan Police officers]